Justin Moose (born November 23, 1983 in Statesville, North Carolina) is a former American soccer player.

Career

College and amateur
Moose played college soccer at Wake Forest University from 2002 to 2005, where he was ACC Rookie of the Year and a NSCAA First Team All-American in 2004 and 2005. He had 29 in assists in his years at Wake Forest, an all-time record for the University.  During his last two years at Wake Forest he also played in the USL Premier Development League with the Carolina Dynamo, earning Rookie of the Year honors in 2004.

Professional
Moose was selected in the first round, 7th overall, by D.C. United in the 2006 MLS SuperDraft. He played in eight Major League Soccer games for the team before being released at the end of 2007. He was briefly re-signed by D.C. in March 2008 to a developmental contract, but released not long after.

Following his release, he joined the Vancouver Whitecaps in the USL. On October 12, 2008, he helped the Whitecaps capture their second USL First Division Championship with the game winning assist against Puerto Rico Islanders 2–1 in Vancouver. On December 16, 2008, the Vancouver Whitecaps announced the re-signing of Moose for the 2009 season.

On February 4, 2011, it was announced that Moose had signed with Sriracha F.C. of the Thai Premier League. Moose then spent a stint in Finland with both HJK Helsinki and SJK.

Moose returned to the United States when he signed with USL Pro's Wilmington Hammerheads on January 9, 2015.

Personal
Moose's brother Andrew plays guitar in a band he co-founded in Hickory, North Carolina. On occasion, Justin sits in on guitar and vocals.

References

External links
 Vancouver Whitecaps bio
 MLS player profile

1983 births
Living people
American soccer players
North Carolina Fusion U23 players
D.C. United players
Wilmington Hammerheads FC players
Major League Soccer players
People from Statesville, North Carolina
Wake Forest Demon Deacons men's soccer players
Vancouver Whitecaps (1986–2010) players
USL League Two players
USL First Division players
USSF Division 2 Professional League players
Expatriate soccer players in Canada
Helsingin Jalkapalloklubi players
Seinäjoen Jalkapallokerho players
D.C. United draft picks
USL Championship players
American expatriate soccer players
Justin Moose
Expatriate footballers in Thailand
Expatriate footballers in Finland
American expatriate sportspeople in Finland
Soccer players from North Carolina
All-American men's college soccer players
Association football midfielders
American expatriate sportspeople in Thailand
American expatriate sportspeople in Canada